Mañeru is a small village and municipality located in the province and  autonomous community of Navarre, northern Spain.

Demography 
From:INE Archiv

References

External links
 MAÑERU in the Bernardo Estornés Lasa - Auñamendi Encyclopedia (Euskomedia Fundazioa) 

Municipalities in Navarre